The extreme points of Africa are the points that are farther north, south, east or west than any other location on the continent.

Latitude and longitude 
Geographic coordinates expressed in WGS 84.

Africa
Africa
 Northernmost point — Iles des Chiens, Tunisia (37°32'N)
 Southernmost point — Cape Agulhas, South Africa (34°51'15"S). If the Prince Edward Islands are included in Africa, then Marion Island is the southernmost point at 46°54'S.
 Westernmost point — Santo Antão, Cape Verde Islands (25°25'W)
 Easternmost point — Rodrigues, Mauritius (63°30'E)

Africa (mainland)

Northernmost point — Ras ben Sakka, Tunisia
Southernmost point — Cape Agulhas, South Africa 
Westernmost point — Pointe des Almadies, Cap Vert Peninsula, Ngor, Dakar, Senegal (17°33'22"W)
Easternmost point — Ras Hafun (Raas Xaafuun), Somalia (51°27'52"E)

Africa (centre)
 The African geographical centre is close to Epena, 
 The African pole of inaccessibility is close to the border of Central African Republic, South Sudan and Congo, near the town of Obo.

Elevation
The highest point in Africa is Mount Kilimanjaro,  in Tanzania.

See also
Geography of Africa
Extreme points of the Earth

References

Geography of Africa
Africa
Africa
Africa